Resolute Bay is an Arctic waterway in the Qikiqtaaluk Region, Nunavut, Canada. It is located in Parry Channel on the southern side of Cornwallis Island. The hamlet of Resolute is located on the northern shore of the bay with Resolute Bay Airport to the northwest. The Inuit associated with Resolute Bay are called Qausuittuq and the population of the hamlet in the 2006 census was 229.

On the western shore, the Defence Research Telecommunications Establishment (DRTE) and the Communications Research Centre Canada operated a launch site for sounding rockets. Between 1966 and 1971 rockets of the types Black Brant and Boosted Arcas were launched.

References

Further reading

 Bremner, Peter C. Diamond Drilling in Permafrost at Resolute Bay, Northwest Territories. Publications of the Dominion Observatory (Ottawa), v. 16, no. 12. Ottawa: Edmond Cloutier, Queen's Printer and Controller of Stationery, 1955.
 Canada, and F. C. Plet. Q-Indices of Magnetic Activity at Resolute Bay, Baker Lake, and Yellowknife Magnetic Observatories for Selected Days of the International Geophysical Year. Publications of the Dominion Observatory, Ottawa, v.27, no. 4. 1963.
 Higdon, Jeff W., and Stefan Romberg. 2006. "Observations of Juvenile Ivory Gulls (Pagophila Eburnea) in Resolute Bay, Nunavut, Canada, August 2005". Polar Record. 42, no. 2: 170-172.
 Hocking, W K. 2001. "Special Section: Early Polar Cap Observatory - Middle Atmosphere Dynamical Studies at Resolute Bay Over a Full Representative Year: Mean Winds, Tides, and Special Oscillations (Paper 2000RS001003)". Radio Science. 36, no. 6: 1795.
 Hodges, J. C., and Howard Francis Bates. The Polar Auroral Radar System McMurdo Base, Antarctica and Resolute Bay, N.W.T., Canada. Menlo Park, Calif: Stanford Research Institute, 1975.
 Lund, Karen E. An Investigation of Cadmium and Lead from a High Arctic Waste Disposal Site, Resolute Bay, Nunavut, Canada. Ottawa: Library and Archives Canada = Bibliothèque et Archives Canada, 2005. 
 Michel, Christine. Biological investigation of first-year sea ice near Resolute Bay, Nunavut, spring to early summer 2001. Winnipeg: Fisheries and Oceans Canada, 2003.
 Sauriol, Jacques. Channel Development and Fluvial Processes in Snow-Filled Valleys, Resolute Bay, N.W.T. Hamilton, Ont: McMaster University, 1978.
 Stocker, Zbigniew Stanislaw J. The Ecology of the Streams at Char Lake, Resolute Bay, North West Territories. Waterloo, Ont: University of Waterloo, Dept. of Biology, 1972.

Mapping

Parry Channel, 
Cornwallis Island, 
Resolute, 

Resolute Bay Airport, 
DRTE/CRC launch site, 

Bays of Qikiqtaaluk Region
Spaceports